Balmus may refer to:
Bălmuș, a tributary of the river Cracăul Negru in Romania
Balmoș or balmuș, a mămăligă-like traditional Romanian dish
Balmus, another name for Siegfried's legendary sword, Gram (mythology)